Crambus alexandrus is a moth in the family Crambidae. It was described by Valentina A. Kirpichnikova in 1979. It is found in Russia (Kuril Islands) and Japan.

References

Crambini
Moths described in 1979
Moths of Asia
Moths of Japan